

See also
List of monastic houses in Ireland

Notes

References

Roscommon
Monastic houses
Monastic houses
Monastic houses